The German-Belgian High Fens – Eifel Nature Park, often called the North Eifel Nature Park (Naturpark Nord Eifel), is a cross-border nature park with elements in the German federal states of North Rhine-Westphalia and Rhineland-Palatinate as well as the Belgian province of Liège.

The nature park lies between Langerwehe and Eupen in the north and Bad Münstereifel, Prüm and Sankt Vith in the south and covers six regions: the Rur Eifel, the High Eifel, the Limestone Eifel, the Our valley, the Venn Foreland and the Hohes Venn, a raised bog and heath landscape, remnants of the last ice age 7,500 years ago.

The geographical description North Eifel in its narrowest sense only covers the Eifel landscape between Zitter Forest in the south and Aachen in the north, Bad Münster Eifel to the east and over the Rur Eifel to the Belgian border in the west. The Hohe Venn is geographically seen as a separate natural region within the whole Eifel area, but is nevertheless included in the nature park.

History 

In 1960, the president of the now-defunct administrative district of Aachen, Hubert Schmitt-Degenhardt, founded the North Eifel Nature Park. In 1971 it was merged with the Belgian Parc Naturel Hautes Fagnes to become the Hohes Venn – Eifel Nature Park. The emblem of the nature park is the black grouse.

Eifel National Park 
In the middle of the nature park, largely around the former Belgian Army military training area at Vogelsang and the Rur Valley Dam, is the Eifel National Park founded in 2004 and expanded after the withdrawal of the Belgians on 1 January 2006.

Literature 
 Baedeker Reiseführer Belgien

See also 
 List of nature parks in Germany

References

External links 
 High Fens – Eifel Nature Park

Geography of Liège Province
Geography of Wallonia
Aachen
Ardennes
Eifel
Nature parks in North Rhine-Westphalia
Parks in Belgium
Tourist attractions in Liège Province
German-speaking Community of Belgium
Ramsar sites in Belgium